Mihovec ( or ) is a settlement in the hills south of Novo Mesto in southeastern Slovenia. The area is part of the traditional region of Lower Carniola and is now included in the Southeast Slovenia Statistical Region.

References

External links
Mihovec on Geopedia

Populated places in the City Municipality of Novo Mesto